Sir Jonathan Phillips  (b. 21 May 1952), is a retired British civil servant who served as Warden  of Keble College, Oxford from 2010 to 2022.

Phillips was appointed as Permanent Secretary of the Northern Ireland Office in 2005 to replace Sir Joseph Pilling), having been Director-General, Political since 2002. Just before he retired in 2010, the Northern Ireland Office transferred a large portion of its duties to the Northern Ireland Executive as part of devolution, and the job of Accounting Officer transferred to the Director-General, Political, Hillary Jackson. He was appointed Knight Commander of the Order of the Bath (KCB) in the 2009 New Year Honours.

He lives with his wife, Amanda, and has two sons, one of whom was elected a Fellow by examination of All Souls' College, Oxford in 2005.

References

Living people
1952 births
Alumni of St John's College, Cambridge
Knights Commander of the Order of the Bath
Wardens of Keble College, Oxford
Permanent Under-Secretaries of State for Northern Ireland